Elize Matsunaga: Once Upon a Crime (Elize Matsunaga: Era uma Vez um Crime) is a 2021 docuseries released on Netflix on July 8, 2021, starring Stephanie Sherry and Elize Matsunaga. Matsunaga shot and dismembered her husband, Marcos Matsunaga, who was a member of the family that formerly owned the Yoki food company in Brazil. Matsunaga is from Chopinzinho.

Cast 
 Stephanie Sherry as Juliana Fincatti Santoro
 Elize Matsunaga

Episodes

References

External links
 
 

2021 Brazilian television series debuts
2021 Brazilian television series endings
2020s Brazilian television series
2020s Brazilian documentary television series
Portuguese-language Netflix original programming
Netflix original documentary television series
Brazilian documentary television series
Dismemberments